Wen Shizhen may refer to:

 Wen Shizhen (born 1877), politician and diplomat in the Republic of China
 Wen Shizhen (1940–2021), Chinese Communist Party politician from Liaoning